Ansuyabai Bhaorao Borkar was a social activist, Indian National Congress politician and member of the 1st Lok Sabha, the lower house of the Indian Parliament from 1955–57.

Early life
Ansuyabai was born in Kampti, Madhya Pradesh (then a part of Central Provinces and Berar) in 1929 to a family of cultivators. She received education from Salem Girls Hindi English Middle School of Raipur.

Career
Borkar was an active social worker and conducted education programs for adult women in Nagpur. She was also a member of the Nagpur district committee of the Indian National Congress (INC) party.

After the death of her husband, a sitting MP, Borkar contested for and won a seat from the two-member Bhandara (Reserved, Madhya Pradesh) constituency in the 1955 bye-election as an INC candidate; obtaining 84,458 votes. The opposing Scheduled Castes Federation candidate secured approx 58,000 votes.

Personal life
In 1947, she married INC politician Bhaurao Borkar. Together they had three daughters. Bhaurao was an MP from Bhandara and died in office on 2 February 1955.

Borkar died in Nagpur, Maharashtra on 18 July 2000.

References

1929 births
2000 deaths
Women members of the Lok Sabha
India MPs 1952–1957
Lok Sabha members from Madhya Pradesh
People from Nagpur district
Indian National Congress politicians from Maharashtra
Indian National Congress politicians from Madhya Pradesh
People from Bhandara district